Tavila is a monotypic moth genus of the family Noctuidae. Its only species, Tavila indeterminata, is found in Zaire and the Democratic Republic of the Congo. Both the genus and species were first described by Francis Walker in 1869.

References

Acontiinae
Monotypic moth genera